Betty Ann Davies (24 December 1910 – 14 May 1955) was a British stage and film actress active from the 1920s to the 1950s. Davies made her first stage appearance at the Palladium in a revue in 1924. The following year she joined Cochran's Young Ladies in revues such as One Dam Thing After Another and This Year of Grace. Davies enjoyed a long and distinguished West End career which included The Good Companions (1934), Morning Star (1942), Blithe Spirit (1943) and Four Winds (1953). Her outstanding stage triumph was in the role of Blanche du Bois, which she took over from Vivien Leigh, in the original West End production of A Streetcar Named Desire. Davies appeared in 38 films, most notably as the future Mrs Polly in The History of Mr. Polly and in the first of the St Trinian's films The Belles of St. Trinian's, and was active in TV at the time of her death. She went into hospital on May 14th 1955 to have an operation for appendicitis, but suffered from complications following surgery and died the same day. She was 44. She left one son, Brook Blackford.

Partial filmography

 My Old Duchess (1934) - Sally Martin
 Death at Broadcasting House (1934) - Poppy Levine
 Youthful Folly (1934)
 Joy Ride (1935) - Anne Maxwell
 Play Up the Band (1935) - Betty Small
 Excuse My Glove (1936) - Ann Haydon
 She Knew What She Wanted (1936) - Frankie
 Chick (1936) - Peggy
 Radio Lover (1936) - Wendy Maradyck
 Tropical Trouble (1936) - Mary Masterman
 Lucky Jade (1937) - Betsy
 Merry Comes to Town (1937) - Marjorie Stafford
 Under a Cloud (1937) - Diana Forbes
 Silver Top (1938) - Dushka Vernon
 Mountains O'Mourne (1938) - Violet Mayfair
 Kipps (1941) - Flo Bates
 It Always Rains on Sunday (1947) - Sadie, his wife
 Escape (1948) - Girl in Park
 To the Public Danger (1948, Short) - Barmaid
 The Passionate Friends (1949) - Miss Joan Layton
 The History of Mr. Polly (1949) - Miriam Larkins Polly
 Now Barabbas (1949) - Rosie
 Man in Black (1949) - Bertha Clavering
 The Blue Lamp (1950) - Mary Bertha Lewis (uncredited)
 Trio (1950) - Mrs. Helen Chester (segment "Sanatorium")
 The Woman with No Name (1950) - Beatrice
 Outcast of the Islands (1951) - Mrs. Williams
 Meet Me Tonight (1952) - Doris Gow (segment "Fumed Oak: An Unpleasant Comedy")
 Cosh Boy (1953) - Elsie
 Grand National Night (1953) - Pinkie Collins
 Gilbert Harding Speaking of Murder (1953) - Selina
 Murder by Proxy (1954) - Mrs. Alicia Brunner
 The Belles of St. Trinian's (1954) - Miss Waters
 Children Galore (1955) - Mrs. Ark
 Alias John Preston (1955) - Mrs. Sandford

References

External links
 

1910 births
1955 deaths
Actresses from London
British film actresses
20th-century British actresses
20th-century English women
20th-century English people